Crescent Heights is a neighbourhood (formerly its own village) located in Calgary, Alberta. It is located in the inner city, immediately north from Downtown. It is bounded to the north by the Trans-Canada Highway, on the east by Edmonton Trail, on the west by 4th Street NW, and to the south by Memorial Drive and the Bow River.

Crescent Heights was originally incorporated as a village on May 1, 1908. It was subsequently annexed by the City of Calgary in 1911 and established as a neighbourhood in 1914.

Crescent Heights is represented in the Calgary City Council by the Ward 7 councillor. The community has an area redevelopment plan in place.

The community will be linked to the city's CTrain rapid-transit system at 9 Avenue N Station when construction of the Green Line is complete in 2027.

History
Crescent Heights was founded in 1895 by Archibald J. McArthur.

Demographics

Residents in this community had a median household income of $43,123, and there were 19.7% low income residents living in the neighbourhood.  As of 2000, 18.7% of the residents were immigrants. A proportion of 9.5% of the buildings were condominiums or apartments, and 6.8% of the housing was used for renting.

Education
The community (and others) is served by Crescent Heights High public school. Due to a shortage of high schools in northeast Calgary, Crescent Heights had a proportion of students bused in from Abbeydale, Taradale, Saddletowne, Marlborough, Marlborough Park and surrounding areas in the 1980s and 1990s, as well as in present times.

See also 
List of former urban municipalities in Alberta
List of neighbourhoods in Calgary

References

External links

Crescent Heights Community Association - calgaryarea.com page

Neighbourhoods in Calgary